The 2018 European Junior & U23 Canoe Sprint Championships was the 7th edition of the European Junior & U23 Canoe Sprint Championships, an international canoe and kayak sprint event organised by the European Canoe Association, and was held in Auronzo di Cadore, Italy, between 28 June and 1 July.

Medal overview

Under 23

Men

Women

Junior

Men

Women

References

External links
Official website
Results under 23
Results juniors

European Junior & U23 Canoe Sprint Championships
European Junior & U23 Canoe Sprint Championships
International sports competitions hosted by Italy
June 2018 sports events in Italy
July 2018 sports events in Italy
Canoeing and kayaking competitions in Italy
Canoeing and kayaking competitions in Europe